Viorica Țurcanu (born 26 April 1954) is a Romanian fencer. She competed in the women's team foil event at the 1980 Summer Olympics.

References

1954 births
Living people
Romanian female fencers
Olympic fencers of Romania
Fencers at the 1980 Summer Olympics
Sportspeople from Bucharest